Narcissus of Athens is numbered among the Seventy Disciples. The Apostle Philip ordained St. Narcissus bishop of Athens. His feast day is October 31.

References

Sources 
St. Nikolai Velimirovic, The Prologue from Ohrid

External links
Apostle Narcissus of the Seventy, January 4 (OCA)
Apostle Narcissus of the Seventy, October 31 (OCA)

Seventy disciples
1st-century Christian saints
1st-century bishops in Roman Achaea
1st-century deaths
Saints of Roman Athens
Year of birth unknown
Ancient Athenians
Bishops of Athens